Ben Rahav (born 29 April 1989) is a former Israeli footballer.

References

External links
 

1989 births
Israeli Jews
Living people
Israeli footballers
Beitar Nes Tubruk F.C. players
Maccabi Haifa F.C. players
Maccabi Ironi Kfar Yona F.C. players
Sektzia Ness Ziona F.C. players
Hapoel Kfar Saba F.C. players
Hapoel Nir Ramat HaSharon F.C. players
Beitar Tel Aviv Bat Yam F.C. players
Beitar Jerusalem F.C. players
Maccabi Sha'arayim F.C. players
Liga Leumit players
Israeli Premier League players
Footballers from Central District (Israel)
Association football goalkeepers